Castello di Salle (Italian for Castle of Salle)  is a  Middle Ages castle in Salle, Province of Pescara (Abruzzo).

History 

The castle was built in the 10th century in Salle vecchia.

Architecture

References

External links

Salle
Salle, Abruzzo